Looney Tunes Golden Collection: Volume 6 is a four-disc DVD box set collection of Looney Tunes and Merrie Melodies cartoons. Following the pattern of one release each year of the previous volumes, it was released on October 21, 2008.

Warner Home Video had announced that this will be the final release in the Golden Collection series.  Succeeding the Golden Collection series would be the Looney Tunes Platinum Collection series on Blu-ray, which had its first release in November 2011. On July 3, 2012, a two-disc DVD version of Volume 1 of the Platinum Collection was released.

Volume 6 is far less child-friendly than the other five volumes. Like Volumes 3, 4, and 5, it has a warning before each disc about the shorts containing content that some viewers would not consider to be "politically correct" by today's standards (but will be shown uncut and uncensored for historical reasons), and as such, is "intended for the adult collector". However, Volume 6's box art disclaimer says that it "is not suitable for children", as opposed to Volumes 3-5, stating that they might not be suitable for younger audiences.

This is due to the fact that, in addition to containing cartoons that have racial and/or ethnic stereotypes (like in Volumes 3, 4, and 5), and references to sexism in Robert McKimson's Wild Wife, Volume 6 also contains many cartoons that pertain to World War II, most of them containing depictions or references to Nazi Fuehrer Adolf Hitler and Hideki Tojo, or to Nazi Germans and Imperial Japan in general. While Volumes 4 and 5 each had a couple World War II-themed cartoons (Plane Daffy and Scrap Happy Daffy, respectively), Volume 6 is notable for having an entire disc dedicated to the subject (Disc 2: Patriotic Pals), including several of its bonus cartoons.

Volume 6 was originally only released in North America due to the poor sales of the previous volume. However, the discs in this volume were not region-coded, making it easy for collectors outside of North America to import and play this set. The set was released in the UK on 12 September 2011.

Disc 1: Looney Tunes All-Stars

Special Features

Commentaries
 Hare Trigger by Greg Ford
 Birth of a Notion by Mark Kausler
 My Favorite Duck by Jerry Beck

Music-only tracks
 Raw! Raw! Rooster!
 Jumpin' Jupiter

Television specials
 Bugs Bunny in King Arthur’s Court (1978)
 Daffy Duck’s Easter Eggcitement (1980)

Bonus Shorts

Bonus Shorts - Music-only tracks 
 Rabbit Rampage
 Boyhood Daze

Disc 2: Patriotic Pals

Special features

Friz Freleng at MGM
 Poultry Pirates (1938)
 A Day at the Beach (1938)
 The Captain’s Christmas (1938)
 Seal Skinners (1939)
 Mama’s New Hat (1939)

Commentaries
 Herr Meets Hare by Greg Ford
 Russian Rhapsody by Mark Kausler
 The Draft Horse by Greg Ford

Music-only track
 Yankee Dood It

Bonus Shorts

Disc 3: Bosko, Buddy and Merrie Melodies
All cartoons on this disc are in black-and-white.

Special features

Commentaries
 Shuffle Off to Buffalo by Jerry Beck
 A Cartoonist's Nightmare by Jerry Beck

The World of Leon Schlesinger
 Introduction by Martha Sigall and Jerry Beck
 Cryin' for the Carolines (1930)
 Haunted Gold title sequence
 Schlesinger Productions Christmas Party with optional commentary by Martha Sigall and Jerry Beck

Bonus Shorts

Disc 4: Most Requested Assorted Nuts and One-Shots

Special Features

Commentaries
 Fresh Airedale by Greg Ford
 The Hole Idea by Mark Kausler

Music-only tracks
 The Hole Idea
 Martian Through Georgia

Bonus documentary
 Mel Blanc: The Man of a Thousand Voices

Bonus Shorts

Bonus Short - Music-only track 
 Wild Wild World

Bonus Short - Music and Effects track 
 Punch Trunk

References

External links

See also
 Looney Tunes and Merrie Melodies filmography
 Looney Tunes and Merrie Melodies filmography (1929–1939)
 Looney Tunes and Merrie Melodies filmography (1940–1949)
 Looney Tunes and Merrie Melodies filmography (1950–1959)
 Looney Tunes and Merrie Melodies filmography (1960–1969)
 Looney Tunes and Merrie Melodies filmography (1970–present and miscellaneous)
 List of Bugs Bunny cartoons

Looney Tunes home video releases